Telescope is a Canadian  documentary series which aired on CBC Television between 1963 and 1973. The series was hosted by Fletcher Markle, which profiled notable Canadian people from celebrities to the unknown, who made a difference.

Starting in September 1966, Telescope was the first regular colour broadcast in Canada.  Its producer was Sam Levene.

In 2008, CBC offered 10 episodes of Telescope on their Digital Archives website. The episodes are from the 1970–71 season, and feature new host Ken Kavanagh.  Among those profiled were game show host Monty Hall, publisher Mel Hurtig, journalist Pat Carney, actor John Vernon, author Farley Mowat, amusement park impresario Patty Conklin, and underwater explorer Joe MacInnis. A 1970 episode featured actor Donald Sutherland including early footage of his son Kiefer.  Mentalist Uri Geller followed a week later by Ray Hyman and Jerry Andrus who explained and duplicated Geller's "paranormal" feats. First Nations filmmaker Alanis Obomsawin has stated that it was an interview with her on Telescope in the early 1960s that first brought her to the attention of the National Film Board of Canada.

References

External links 
 Queen's University Directory of CBC Television Series (Telescope archived listing link via archive.org)
 
 CBC Digital Archives – Telescope

1963 Canadian television series debuts
1973 Canadian television series endings
1960s Canadian documentary television series
1970s Canadian documentary television series
Black-and-white Canadian television shows
CBC Television original programming
English-language television shows